Joshua Clark Davis (born September 1, 1972) is an American former competition swimmer, Olympic gold medalist, and former world record-holder.  Davis represented the United States at two consecutive Summer Olympics.

College and international career 
He attended the University of Texas at Austin, where he swam for coach Eddie Reese's Texas Longhorns swimming and diving team in National Collegiate Athletic Association (NCAA) competition.

At the 1996 Summer Olympics in Atlanta, Georgia, he won gold medals by swimming for the winning U.S. teams in the 4×100-meter freestyle relay and 4×200-meter freestyle relay.  He earned a third gold medal by swimming for the first-place U.S. team in the preliminary heats of the 4×100-meter medley relay.  He also competed in the 200-meter freestyle, and finished seventh in the event final with a time of 1:48.54.

Four years later at the 2000 Summer Olympics in Sydney, Australia, he served as the captain of the U.S. swimming team.  At the 2000 Olympics, he won silver medals swimming for the second-place U.S. teams in the preliminary heats of the 4×100-meter freestyle relay, and the final of the 4×200-meter freestyle relay.  He again competed in the 200-meter freestyle, finishing in fourth place in the final with a time of 1:46.73.

He also swam for the U.S. national team at:
 World Championships: 1994, 1998
 Pan American Games: 1995
 Pan Pacific Championships: 1993, 1997, 1999
 World University Games: 1995
 Short Course Worlds: 2000

Life outside competitive swimming 
Completed in 2001, the newer natatorium at North East independent school District's Virgil T. Blossom Athletic Center (the district where Davis attended school) in San Antonio was named in his honor.

In February 2009 four of Davis' Olympic medals—three gold medals and one silver medal—were stolen from his car after he returned from a swim clinic in St. Louis. On February 13, 2009, cleanup crews found the medals outside one of the Salvation Army's Boys and Girls Clubs in San Antonio.  The medals were returned to Davis at a news conference later that night.

On June 1, 2016, Davis was named as the first coach of Oklahoma Christian University's swimming programs, charged with building men's and women's teams for competition that will begin with the 2017-18 season. It is Davis' first collegiate coaching job. Oklahoma Christian University is currently the only college in Oklahoma offering intercollegiate swimming.

Davis and his wife Shantel live in Edmond, Oklahoma, and have six children.

See also

 Bill Boomer, swimming coach
 List of multiple Olympic gold medalists
 List of multiple Olympic gold medalists at a single Games
 List of Olympic medalists in swimming (men)
 List of University of Texas at Austin alumni
 List of World Aquatics Championships medalists in swimming (men)
 World record progression 4 × 200 metres freestyle relay

References

External links
 US Olympic Committee
 SanAntonioSports.com
 Josh Davis homepage

1972 births
Living people
American male freestyle swimmers
World record setters in swimming
Medalists at the FINA World Swimming Championships (25 m)
Olympic gold medalists for the United States in swimming
Olympic silver medalists for the United States in swimming
Sportspeople from San Antonio
Swimmers at the 1995 Pan American Games
Swimmers at the 1996 Summer Olympics
Swimmers at the 2000 Summer Olympics
Texas Longhorns men's swimmers
World Aquatics Championships medalists in swimming
Medalists at the 2000 Summer Olympics
Medalists at the 1996 Summer Olympics
Pan American Games gold medalists for the United States
Pan American Games bronze medalists for the United States
Pan American Games medalists in swimming
Universiade medalists in swimming
Goodwill Games medalists in swimming
Oklahoma Christian Eagles and Lady Eagles swimming coaches
Universiade gold medalists for the United States
Universiade silver medalists for the United States
Universiade bronze medalists for the United States
Medalists at the 1991 Summer Universiade
Medalists at the 1995 Summer Universiade
Competitors at the 1998 Goodwill Games
Medalists at the 1995 Pan American Games
Swimmers from Texas